The EuroBasket 2025 qualification is a basketball competition that is being played from November 2021 to February 2025, to determine the FIBA Europe nations who will qualify for the EuroBasket 2025 finals tournament.

Format changes
Similar, as for the previous edition, the format involves pre-qualifiers and qualifiers. The pre-qualifiers first round comprises teams that did not play in the 2023 FIBA World Cup qualifiers. Due to the 2022 Russian invasion of Ukraine, FIBA changed the qualification system during the pre-qualifiers first round.

Old format
The pre-qualifiers first round is played by ten teams: Eight eliminated in the 2023 FIBA Basketball World Cup pre-qualifiers, and two teams who did not apply to enter in those qualifiers. They are divided into three groups: two groups of three teams and one group with four teams. The winner of each group and the best runner-up team would qualify for the second round.
The pre-qualifiers second round would be played by twelve teams: Eight eliminated in the 2023 FIBA Basketball World Cup qualifiers first round, and four teams that advanced from the first round. They would then be divided into four groups by three teams with the group winners advancing to the Qualifiers. The pre-qualifiers third round would be played by all remaining teams from the first and the second round which failed to advance to the qualifiers. They would compete for the four last places in the qualifiers.

New format
The pre-qualifiers first round is kept playing in the original format since the  decision about a competition system change was taken during its progress. In the meanwhile, Cyprus was announced as the tournament host, while Russia and Belarus were expelled from all FIBA competitions, which implied few format changes. Instead of originally four teams, now six teams advance from the pre-qualifiers first round to the second round: three group winners, two best runners-up and Cyprus as host nation, regardless of their result. 
The pre-qualifiers second round will be played by twelve teams: Six (instead of original eight following exclusion of Russia and Belarus) eliminated in the 2023 FIBA Basketball World Cup Qualifiers first round, and six teams advancing from the first round. Unlike the initial format, they will be divided into three groups by four teams with the group winners and Cyprus advancing to the qualifiers. The pre-qualifiers third round will be played by all other teams from the first two rounds without any changes.

Qualifiers will be played by 32 teams: 24 teams competing at the second round of 2023 FIBA World Cup qualifiers joined by eight teams advanced from Pre-Qualifiers.

Pre-Qualifiers
The EuroBasket 2025 Pre-Qualifiers will be played over three rounds. The best eight teams advance to the EuroBasket 2025 Qualifiers.

First round
The pre-qualifiers first round was played in three windows: 25–28 November 2021; 24–27 February and 30 June – 3 July 2022.

The winner of each group, the two best runners-up team and Cyprus as a host nation qualified for the second round. All other teams were transferred to the third round.

Draw
The draw was made on 20 August 2021.

Seeding
The seeding was based on the FIBA World Rankings of 9 August 2021.

Groups
All times are local.

Group A

Group B

Group C

Ranking of second-placed teams
Matches against the fourth-placed team in Group A are not included in this ranking.

Second round
The pre-qualifiers second round was played in three windows: August 2022, November 2022 and February 2023.

The twelve teams were drawn into three groups by four teams. The winner of each group along with the tournament host Cyprus advanced to the Qualifiers. All other teams were transferred to the third round.

Draw
The draw was made on 14 July 2022.

Teams

Groups
All times are local.

Group D

Group E

Group F

Third round
The pre-qualifiers third round will be played from 19 July to 5 August 2023. Twelve teams will participate: the four teams eliminated from the first round are joined by the eight teams eliminated from the second round. The teams will play in four groups of three; the four best-ranked teams will advance to the Qualifiers.

Teams

Qualifiers
The EuroBasket 2025 Qualifiers will be played in the following windows: November 2023, February 2024,  November 2024 and February 2025. 
32 teams, including Eurobasket co-hosts, will be drawn into eight groups by four teams. Three teams from each group will qualify for the Eurobasket 2025. For the groups containing the host teams, the host and the two other highest placed teams will qualify for the tournament.

Teams

References

External links
Qualifiers website
Pre-qualifiers website
Tournament summary

Q
2021–22 in European basketball
2022–23 in European basketball
2025